Lauterach is a town in the district of Bregenz in the Austrian state of Vorarlberg.
Honorary consulates of Finland, and the United Kingdom are located in Lauterach.

The Lauterach Transmitter is a 116 m tall broadcasting facility.

European route E60 passes through Lauterach.

Population

Personalities
 Bruno Pezzey (1955–1994), 84-time national football player
 Julian Knowle (b. 1974), tennis player
 André Pilz (b. 1972), writer
 Markus Weissenberger (b. 1975), soccer player
 Christian Hirschbühl (b. 1990), ski racer

References

External links 
 Lauterach's Website

Cities and towns in Bregenz District